Ernie Hart  (4 June 1912 – 7 September 2001) was an Australian rules footballer who played with Melbourne in the Victorian Football League (VFL).

Hart played his only senior game for Melbourne a day after his 31st birthday, against Richmond at Punt Road Oval. He instead spent most of him time in the seconds and won the Gardiner Medal in 1943.

Before coming to the VFL, Hart played his football for Northcote and was joint coach with Jack Lyngcoln in 1937.

References

External links

1912 births
Australian rules footballers from Victoria (Australia)
Melbourne Football Club players
Northcote Football Club players
Northcote Football Club coaches
2001 deaths